Mauesia cornuta is a species of beetle in the family Cerambycidae. It was described by Lane in 1956. It is known from French Guiana and Brazil.

References

Mauesiini
Beetles described in 1956